Sea anemone dermatitis is a cutaneous condition similar to jellyfish and hydroid dermatitis, caused by contact with certain sea anemones.

See also 
 Skin lesion
 List of cutaneous conditions

References 

Parasitic infestations, stings, and bites of the skin
Invertebrate attacks